Queluz is a municipality in the state of São Paulo in Brazil. It is part of the Metropolitan Region of Vale do Paraíba e Litoral Norte.

Location

The municipality contains part of the  Mananciais do Rio Paraíba do Sul Environmental Protection Area, created in 1982 to protect the sources of the Paraíba do Sul river.
The northeast boundary is shared with two other states, Minas Gerais to the north and Rio de Janeiro to the east.

History

The city came from a village of Purí Indians in the year of 1800. The village grew up around a chapel built by Indians and slaves under the leadership of father Francisco das Chagas Lima, who was sent to evangelize the Purí people, where he stands today is the Mother Church. The city was incorporated in 1876. The patron saint of Queluz is St. John the Baptist, and the name Queluz is a tribute to the Imperial Family, sharing the name of the town where D. Pedro I was born. Coffee culture is important to the municipality, as farms still exist in the surrounding countryside of Sertão, São José, Restauração, Bela Aurora, Regato, Cascata, etc.

Population history

Climate
The climate of Queluz is tropical, the year-round average low temperature is 16 degrees Celsius, and the average high temperature is 26 degrees Celsius.

Economy
The economic development of the municipality is related to farming and the production of toys from wood, leather, and embroidery. The secondary sector have contributed significantly to the region's economic development. The presence in the region of Brazil's main steel producer, the Companhia Siderurgica Nacional (CSN) is advantageous to industry in the region, such as the Volkswagen truck factory in Resende, 32 km from Queluz, and the Peugeot factory in Resende. Industries established in Queluz are exempt from municipal taxes for ten years; the council also supports negotiations with state and federal governments to reduce other taxes. To encourage the development of new industries, the mayor can donate land with infrastructure already available.

Touristic points

Railway station: built in 1874 to replace the other destroyed by fire. In 1999 it was transferred to the city, is being prepared to house a future Cultural Area. Located on Rua Tenente Manoel França.

BUILDING THE DESQUE:
Dating from 1830, in Baroque style, was built to serve as the Parish House, later hosted the Santa Casa. Today, it is headquarters of the Secretaries of Education, Culture and Tourism, the Municipal Library and Museum Malba Tahan (great writer and mathematician, author of the book Maktub, among others). Located at the Praça Padre Francisco das Chagas Lima.

BUILDING THE FORUM:
Built in 1900, in colonial style, has also served as Chain Public, Police Station, Posting Police Headquarters of the former Public Force of the state. Located at the Praça Portugal.

SCHOOL BUILDING GROUP:
Inaugurated in 1915, in style of the time, today houses the School of Education Foundation Hall Capitão Jose Carlos de Oliveira Garcez.

HOUSE OF MALBA TAHAN:
Great writer and mathematician, who lived until adolescence in Queluz, author of several books famous as Maktub and The Man who Calculava. Located near the Church.

BRIDGE ON THE RIO PARAIBA DO SUL:
Built in 1933, replacing the old bridge (its foundations are still visible) exploded for "Forças Legalistas" in Revolution of 1932, to prevent the movement of forces of the government of the time.

CHURCH OD SÃO JOÃO BATISTA:
Construction dated 1830, on an existing chapel, still retains its original features. It houses an image of São João Batista, patron of the city, carved in wood and coming of Portugal.

HEADQUARTERS OF FARM RESTAURAÇÃO:
Built in 1850, the foot of the Serra da Mantiqueira, in the cycle of coffee, it is private property and served as a landing for the Emperor D. Pedro, when of your trip.

PICO PEDRA DA MINA:
Own for the practitioners of trekking, hiking, climbing and camping wild. The site is not yet open for visitation because of the difficulty of access. The council demanded the recognition and installation of the National Park of Stone's Mina. Access by Cascadura Farm.

MIRANTE DO CRISTO:
Image of Christ the Redeemer that with open arms bless the city. Can be seen throughout the city and part of the Vale do Paraiba and the Serra da Mantiqueira. Access by car for the Road Queluz / Areias.

References

External links

  https://web.archive.org/web/20070929011606/http://www.queluz.tur.br/
  Queluz on citybrazil.com.br
Municipal anthem of Queluz 

Municipalities in São Paulo (state)
Populated places established in 1876
1876 establishments in Brazil